The Memphis Tigers football team represents the University of Memphis in college football. The team competes in the West Division of the American Athletic Conference as part of the NCAA Division I Football Bowl Subdivision. The team has had 25 head coaches since it began in 1912. Since the end of the 2019 regular season, Ryan Silverfield has served as head coach of the Tigers.

As of the conclusion of the 2020 season, the team has played 1,066 games over 109 seasons. In that time, six head coaches and one interim coach have led the Tigers in postseason play. The first was Ralph Hatley in 1956, who led Memphis to a 32–12 victory over Middle Tennessee in the Burley Bowl, a game not sanctioned by the NCAA. The second was Billy J. Murphy, who, in his final year at the helm in Memphis, took the Tigers to the Pasadena Bowl, where they defeated San Jose State. After Murphy, the Tigers did not make another postseason appearance until Tommy West's third season, where Memphis started a streak of six bowl games in seven years, starting with the 2003 New Orleans Bowl and ending with the 2008 St. Petersburg Bowl. The final two of Justin Fuente's four seasons produced postseason appearances for the Tigers, the 2014 Miami Beach Bowl and the 2015 Birmingham Bowl. Darrell Dickey coached the latter of the two in an interim capacity following Fuente's departure for Virginia Tech. Mike Norvell, to date, has more postseason appearances with Memphis than any other coach, with six: three conference championships and three bowl games. The team's first-ever New Year's Six bowl appearance came under Ryan Silverfield, who took over from Norvell for the 2019 Cotton Bowl Classic after Norvell departed for Florida State.

Allyn McKeen, who led the Tigers for two years from 1937 to 1938, is the only former Memphis coach to be inducted into the College Football Hall of Fame. In his second and final season at Memphis, McKeen led the Tigers to an undefeated record, their first in eleven years.

Key

Coaches

Notes

References

Lists of college football head coaches

Memphis Tigers football coaches